Oxfam is a British-founded confederation of 21 independent charitable organizations focusing on the alleviation of global poverty, founded in 1942 and led by Oxfam International.

History

Founded at 17 Broad Street, Oxford, as the Oxford Committee for Famine Relief by a group of Quakers, social activists, and Oxford academics in 1942 and registered in accordance with UK law in 1943, the original committee was a group of concerned citizens, including Henry Gillett (a prominent local Quaker), Theodore Richard Milford, Gilbert Murray and his wife Mary, Cecil Jackson-Cole, and Alan Pim. The committee met in the Old Library of University Church of St Mary the Virgin, Oxford, for the first time in 1942, and its aim was to help starving citizens of occupied Greece, a famine caused by the Axis occupation of Greece and Allied naval blockades and to persuade the British government to allow food relief through the blockade. The Oxford committee was one of several local committees formed in support of the National Famine Relief Committee.

Oxfam's first paid employee was Joe Mitty, who began working at the Oxfam shop on Broad Street, Oxford, on 9 November 1949. Engaged to manage the accounts and distribute donated clothing, he originated the policy of selling anything people were willing to donate, and developed the shop into a national chain.

Fundraising innovations led by advertising adviser Harold Sumption, including rigorous testing of advertising campaigns, direct mail, the trading catalogue, and the first multimedia fundraising campaign the "Hunger £ Million", helped Oxfam become, for a time, the largest charity in the UK. By 1960, it was an international nongovernmental aid organization.
The first overseas committee was founded in Canada in 1963, and in 1965, the organization changed its name to its telegraphic address, OXFAM. The Oxford committee became known as Oxfam Great Britain or Oxfam GB.
In 1995 Oxfam International was formed by a group of independent non-governmental organizations. Stichting Oxfam International was registered as a non-profit foundation at The Hague, Netherlands, in 1996.

Winnie Byanyima was the executive director of Oxfam International from 2013 to 2019.

Oxfam's work

Focus 

Oxfam has provided relief services during various global crises, including the Israeli–Palestinian conflict, North Korean famine, 2011 East Africa drought, 2012 Sahel drought, Nepal earthquake, and Yemeni crisis. The Bosfam NGO was also founded in May 1995 by women participating in an Oxfam GB psychosocial 'radionice' project to support internally displaced women during the Bosnian war. Oxfam has become a globally recognized leader in providing water sanitation to impoverished and war-torn areas the world over. In 2012, Oxfam became one of the humanitarian groups that comprise the UK's Rapid Response Facility to ensure clean water in the wake of humanitarian disasters.

A January 2014 Oxfam report stated that the 85 wealthiest individuals in the world have a combined wealth equal to that of the bottom 50% of the world's population, or about 3.5 billion people. More recently, in January 2015, Oxfam reported that the wealthiest 1 percent will own more than half of the global wealth by 2016. An Oxfam report released in 2017 stated that eight billionaires possess the same amount of wealth as the poorest half of humanity.

Campaigns
The Make Trade Fair campaign organized by Oxfam International focuses on the elimination of trade practices, such as dumping, which occurs when highly subsidized, surplus commodities from developed countries such as rice, cotton, corn, and sugar are sold at low prices and farmers from poor countries have difficulty competing. Another practice Oxfams opposes is the setting of tariffs, where nations enforce high taxes on imported goods, restricting the sales of products from other nations, unbalanced labour rights for women, who often earn lower wages than their male counterparts, and stringent patent issues that prevent the prices of medication, software, and textbooks (e.g. gene patents, chemical patents, and software patents) from being lowered. Thus, such essential goods are often inaccessible to developing nations.

Shops

Oxfam has shops all over the world, which sell many fair-trade and donated items since their first charity shop opened in 1948, although trading began in 1947. The proceeds from these are used to further Oxfam's mission and relief efforts around the globe. Much of their stock comes from public donations but as of 2012 they still sold fair trade products from developing countries in Africa, Asia and South America, including handcrafts, books, music CDs and instruments, clothing, toys, food, and ethnic creations. These objects are brought to the public through fair trade to help boost the quality of life of their producers and surrounding communities.

As of 2010, Oxfam had over 1,200 shops worldwide. More than half of them were in the UK, with around 750 Oxfam GB shops, including specialist shops such as books, music, furniture, and bridal wear. Oxfam Germany has 45 shops, including specialist book shops; Oxfam France shops sell books and fair-trade products, and Oxfam Hong Kong has two shops selling donated goods and fair-trade products. Oxfam Novib, Oxfam Australia (with over 20 fair trade shops), Oxfam Ireland and Oxfam in Belgium also raise funds from shops.

Of the Oxfam charity shops around the UK, around 100 are specialist bookshops or book and music shops. Oxfam is the largest retailer of second-hand books in Europe, selling around 12 million per year. In 2008, Oxfam GB worked with over 20,000 volunteers in shops across the UK, raising £17.1 million for Oxfam's programme work.

In the wake of the 2018 sexual abuse scandal, CEO Mark Goldring admitted closures of some Oxfam shops were likely. Allegations also appeared at this time regarding sexual harassment in Oxfam shops in Britain. Sector press later reported that Oxfam closed 26 of its shops in 2020 and that shops made an operational loss of £12.9 million in 2020, with further closures reported in local media thereafter.

Fundraising
Oxfam has several successful fundraising channels in addition to its shops. Over half a million people in the UK make a regular financial contribution to its work. In April 2017, the Information Commissioner's Office fined Oxfam charities for breaching the Data Protection Act by misusing donors' personal data. Oxfam was fined £6,000.

Offices and affiliates

Oxfam international consists of 21 affiliates and the international secretariat in Nairobi. Additional offices were in Addis Abeba, Washington, DC, New York City, Brussels, and Geneva.

Oxfam Japan was a member from 2003 to its closure 2018.

Oxfam International

The Oxfam International Secretariat (OIS) leads, facilitates, and supports collaboration between the Oxfam affiliates. The OIS Board comprises the executive director, chair of each affiliate, and the OI chair. The affiliates' chairs are voting members and are not remunerated. The executive directors and the OI Chair are all non-voting members. The board also elects the deputy chair and treasurer from among its voting members. The board is responsible for ensuring that Oxfam International is accountable, transparent, and fit for purpose. In 2009–10, it had about 77 staff (including secondment placements and temporary staff). It is funded by contributions from affiliate organizations and has an operating budget of US$8.7M. The legal name of the entity is Stichting Oxfam International.

Oxfam America

In 1970, Oxfam America became an independent nonprofit organization and an Oxfam affiliate in response to the humanitarian crisis created by the fight for independence in Bangladesh. Oxfam America's headquarters are located in Boston, Massachusetts, with a policy and campaigns office in Washington, D.C., and seven regional offices around the world. A registered 501(c)3 organization, Oxfam America campaigns for climate change adaptation, food security, aid reform, access to medicines, and fair trade. Ray Offenheiser served as the president and CEO of Oxfam America from 1996 until 2016. As of 2017, the president and CEO is Abby Maxman.

Oxfam Australia

Oxfam Australia is an independent, not-for-profit, secular, community-based aid and development organization, and an affiliate of Oxfam International.

Oxfam IBIS (Denmark)
IBIS was founded as an independent organization in 1991, but has its roots in the Danish department of World University Service and has been active since the 1966 (initially mainly against apartheid and similar situations in other southern African nations). Since the 1970s, it mainly worked with projects in Africa and Latin America, and usually focused on democracy, education and the causes of poverty. In 2014 IBIS became an observer member of Oxfam and in October 2016 it became a full member. Around the same time, the name was modified from IBIS to Oxfam IBIS.

Oxfam GB (Great Britain)
Oxfam GB's headquarters are in Cowley, Oxford. The finance office is in Newcastle, from where Oxfam shops are managed. Oxfam GB had a total income of £408.6m in 2016/17, had 5,000 employees, and used the services of 23,000 volunteers. 
In 2016 it received £31.7m from the British government. Mark Goldring was the chief executive officer from 2013 until January 2019, when he was replaced by Dr Dhananjayan (Danny) Sriskandarajah.

Oxfam India 
Oxfam's involvement in India began when money was granted in 1951 to fight famine in Bihar. Bihar at the time was one of the poorest and most populated states in India.

Oxfam had launched an appeal that led to the first report of Oxfam's work in the House of Commons in UK. On 31 May 1951, Secretary of State for Commonwealth Relations had commended the Bihar appeal, stating "the Oxford Committee for Famine Relief has made an appeal for donations and I hope individuals will reply to that generously". Among the many donations received was one for 100 British pounds from an Indian Rajah in appreciation of what Oxfam was doing for the hungry of his country.

Bihar and famine would bring Oxfam back to India in 1965 to address drought due to bad monsoons. Bihar held a population of 53 million, of which 40 million relied on subsistence farming to live. This would compound for India in the future; production of food had not been parallel to its exploding population. It is estimated that, over the course of the droughts and famines, 2,400 tons of milk was bought by Oxfam and at the height of this was feeding over 400,000 children and mothers. In 1968 Oxfam's first field director in India, Jim Howard, created the Oxfam Gramdan Action Programme, or OGAP. This was the first joint rural development programme in Oxfam and the first step to a new 'operational' Oxfam. Oxfam India was established on 1 September 2008 under section 25 of the Companies Act, 1956 as a non-profitable organization with its head office in Delhi and is now a member of Oxfam International Confederation. This was marked by Oxfam's 60th year in India.

Effective from January 1, 2022, Oxfam lost its foreign-funding license registration under the Foreign Contribution Regulation Act (FCRA) which is mandatory for charities, NGOs and any non-profit organisations receiving foreign funding in India along with 6,000 other such organisations.

Oxfam New Zealand
Oxfam New Zealand is an aid and development organization and affiliate of Oxfam International. Oxfam NZ is also responsible for delivering Cyclone relief in several countries in the Pacific region. Oxfam New Zealand's work is made possible by supporters, interns, staff, volunteers, board and overseas partners. Most of the staff are based in their Auckland office. They also have a policy unit in Wellington. Most of Oxfam New Zealand's funds come from donations, supplemented by New Zealand government funds.

Criticism

Israeli–Palestinian conflict
In 2002, Oxfam Belgium published a poster inciting a boycott of Israel, with a caricature of a bloody orange. The resemblance of the bleeding orange to the antisemitic blood libel was considered blatant, notably by the Simon Wiesenthal Center. Following their complaint, Oxfam International communicated that it does not support the boycott of Israel, that it considers the poster message to have been inappropriate, that it regrets Oxfam's association with this type of message and offered an apology. Oxfam Belgium was reprimanded by the president Ian Anderson.

In October 2009, Oxfam was accused by Israeli NGO Regavim of aiding Palestinians in illegal activities in Kiryat Arba, including water theft. Oxfam has denied its participation.

Oxfam UK has partnered with the Board of Deputies who represent the Jewish community of the UK. The project, Grow-Tatzmiach, includes sending 25 people to an activist training programme to help fight global hunger. In exchange for partnering, Oxfam has agreed not to "call for a boycott of Israeli goods or to support groups that do so, and will not partner with organizations that advocate violence or oppose a two-state solution to the Israeli–Palestinian conflict". Despite this agreement, there are still those on both sides who object to this project.

In response to a 2012 Oxfam report which laid the blame for poor economic development in the Palestinian territories solely with Israel, a spokesman for the Israel embassy in the UK said, "Oxfam's latest report on the situation in the Palestinian territories puts a clearly political agenda above any humanitarian concern. Far from advancing peace, such an approach undermines the prospects of reaching a negotiated resolution to the conflict."

As of 2013 Oxfam endorsed the two-state solution and wants Israel to lift the blockade of the Gaza Strip and dismantle all of the Israeli settlement infrastructure.

On 17 January 2014 Oxfam UK cancelled an exhibition, "Gaza: Through my Eyes", which had been due to take place at East London Mosque after Left Foot Forward presented information to the charity detailing homophobic and potentially anti-semitic comments by one of the organizers, Ibrahim Hewitt. Human rights campaigner Peter Tatchell was reported as welcoming the event's cancellation but to have said of Oxfam UK, "it is hugely disappointing that it did no proper checks on (Mr. Hewitt) before agreeing his presence."

On 29 January 2014 actress Scarlett Johansson resigned as an international spokeswoman for Oxfam after appearing in a TV ad for SodaStream, a company with presence in the West Bank. Her publicist stated that Johansson "respectfully decided to end her ambassador role with Oxfam after eight years ... She and Oxfam have a fundamental difference of opinion in regards to the boycott, divestment and sanctions movement."

In February 2015, Israeli NGO Regavim released a report stating that the European Union had illegally funded the construction of houses; Oxfam and other NGOs participated in the project. Oxfam defended the construction "on humanitarian grounds."

In 2019, the Israeli intelligence services implicated Oxfam Belgium, in funding the PFLP, which carried out a bomb attack the same year and killed the Jewish teenager Rina Sneirb. Oxfam Belgium transferred funds to the subsidiary in the amount of 288,002 euros from 2017 to 2018, but claims to have made no funding since.

In March 2020, the ambassador of Israel in the United Kingdom, Mark Regev, protested the selling of antisemitic books on Oxfam website, notably the Protocols of the Elders of Zion. After the protest, the Oxfam GB chief executive apologized and removed the books from sale.

In October 2020 NBC News reported Oxfam was on the list of human rights organizations the Trump administration was considering branding as anti-Semitic.

Internal structures and political role

In October 2005, the magazine New Internationalist described Oxfam as a "Big International Non-Government Organisation (BINGO)", having a corporate-style, undemocratic internal structure, and addressing the symptoms rather than the causes of international poverty – especially by acquiescing to neoliberal economics and even taking over roles conventionally filled by national governments. Similar criticism came from Red Pepper magazine in July 2005 and Katherine Quarmby in the New Statesman in May 2005. The latter article detailed growing rifts between Oxfam and other organisations within the Make Poverty History movement.

In a 2011 Columbia Journalism Review article, journalist Karen Rothmyer accused NGOs in general and Oxfam in particular of being unduly influenced by the priorities of the media, of providing inaccurate information to the press ("stories featuring aid projects often rely on dubious numbers provided by the organisations") and of perpetuating negative stereotypes which "have the potential to influence policy". She drew on earlier work by journalist Lauren Gelfand, who had taken a year away from journalism to work for Oxfam: "A lot of what Oxfam does is to sustain Oxfam"; and Linda Polman, author of the Crisis Caravan: "Aid organisations are businesses dressed up like Mother Theresa".
In 2015, Omaar and de Waal, in Food and Power in Sudan, commented, "the 1990s have seen growing pressure for humanitarian institutions to become more accountable. There has been a succession of reviews of operations, growing in independence and criticism." They quote an OECD report, "The Joint Evaluation of Emergency Operations in Rwanda", which stated that its team "came across examples of Agencies telling, if not falsehoods, then certainly half-truths" and noted "a remarkable lack of attempts by agencies to seek the views of beneficiaries on the assistance being provided".

Conflict with Starbucks on Ethiopian coffee, 2006
On 26 October 2006, Oxfam accused Starbucks of asking the National Coffee Association (NCA) to block a US trademark application from Ethiopia for three of the country's coffee beans, Sidamo, Harar and Yirgacheffe. They claimed this could result in denying Ethiopian coffee farmers potential annual earnings of up to £47m. Ethiopia and Oxfam America urged Starbucks to sign a licensing agreement with Ethiopia to help boost prices paid to farmers. At issue was Starbucks' use of Ethiopia's coffee brands – Sidamo, Yirgacheffe and Harar – that generate high margins for Starbucks and cost consumers a premium, yet generated very low prices to Ethiopian farmers. Robert Nelson, the head of the NCA, added that his organization initiated the opposition for economic reasons, "For the U.S. industry to exist, we must have an economically stable coffee industry in the producing world ... This particular scheme is going to hurt the Ethiopian coffee farmers economically." The NCA claimed the Ethiopian government was being badly advised and this move could price them out of the market.

Facing more than 90,000 letters of concern, Starbucks had placed pamphlets in its stores accusing Oxfam of "misleading behavior" and insisting that its "campaign need[s] to stop". On 7 November, The Economist derided Oxfam's "simplistic" stance and Ethiopia's "economically illiterate" government, arguing that Starbucks' (and Illy's) standards-based approach would ultimately benefit farmers more. 
In June 2007, Ethiopian Government representatives and senior leaders from Starbucks Coffee Company worked out an agreement regarding distribution, marketing and licensing that recognized the importance and integrity of Ethiopia's specialty coffee designations without disclosing financial terms. Starbucks was set to market Ethiopian coffee during two promotional periods in 2008. An Oxfam spokesman said the deal sounds like a "useful step" as long as farmers are benefiting, and a big step from a year prior when Starbucks "wasn't engaging directly (with) Ethiopians on adding value to their coffee".

Fair trade coffee
On 28 April 2007 an Australian conservative think tank, the Institute of Public Affairs, lodged a complaint with the Australian Competition & Consumer Commission accusing Oxfam of misleading or deceptive conduct under the Trade Practices Act in its promotion of Fairtrade coffee. They claimed that high certification costs and low wages for workers undermine claims that Fairtrade helps to lift producers out of poverty. The complaint was subsequently dismissed by the commission, which said that it was based on evidence that "may be subject to different interpretations". It also said that interpreting fair trade principles was outside its jurisdiction.

Confrontation with Population Matters
In December 2009 Duncan Green, head of research at Oxfam, attempted to discredit the PopOffsets initiative of Population Matters (formerly known as the Optimum Population Trust), under which individuals can offset their carbon emissions by funding family planning services in the developing world. Green wrote in an op-ed in the New Statesman that assumptions such as those in the OPT report equating population growth and environmental degradation are a "gross oversimplification".

In response, OPT described the response of parts of the development lobby to the initiative as "frankly disgraceful", adding: "The world badly needs a grown-up, rational discussion of the population issue ... without blame, abuse and hysteria."

Bookshops

In 2010 Oxfam was criticized for aggressively expanding its specialist bookshops, using tactics more often associated with multi-national corporations. The charity has been criticized as some claim this expansion has come at the expense of independent secondhand book sellers and other charity shops in many areas of the UK.

Dole Food Company
In May 2013 Oxfam demanded Dole remove its 'Ethical Choice' labels from its bananas in New Zealand until it improved treatment of its workers in the Philippines.

Accusations of data manipulation

2015 study on net worth inequality
Time Inc. Network wrote a reply to an Oxfam study from January 2015 on inequality stating that the richest 1% at the end of 2016 will own more than half of the world's assets. However, Time pointed out that the data were based on a study from Credit Suisse. In this study, The Global Wealth Databook 2015, personal assets were calculated in net worth, meaning wealth would be negated by having any mortgages.

"Profiting from Pain" report
Oxfam's 2022 "Profiting from Pain" report claims that 1 million people fall into poverty every 33 hours. Journalist Noah Smith observed that the report depended on incorrectly cited numbers, allegedly from the World Bank, claiming that 198 million people would become poor in 2022. However, the number in question represented the worst-case increase in global poverty between 2020 and 2022, rather than the increase for 2022 alone, which was according to the World Bank likely closer to 12 million. Further, the Oxfam data added an additional claim of 65 million people further falling into poverty due to the Ukraine War, in spite of the fact that the World Bank already considers the Ukraine conflict when making its poverty projections.

Staff sexual misconduct in Haiti and Chad 
In February 2018 an investigation by The Times newspaper found that Oxfam allowed three men to resign and sacked four for gross misconduct after an inquiry concerning sexual exploitation, the downloading of pornography, bullying and intimidation. A 2011 confidential report by Oxfam had found "a culture of impunity" among some staff in Haiti and concluded that 'it cannot be ruled out that any of the prostitutes were under-aged'. Among the staff who were permitted to resign was the charity's Belgian country director, Roland Van Hauwermeiren. In the internal report, Van Hauwermeiren admitted using prostitutes at a villa whose rent was paid for by Oxfam with charitable funds. Oxfam's chief executive at the time, Dame Barbara Stocking, offered Hauwermeiren "a phased and dignified exit" because sacking him risked "potentially serious implications" for the charity's work and reputation. Allegations were also circulated by the Daily Mail at this time regarding sexual harassment in Oxfam shops in Britain.

Oxfam did not report any of the incidents to the Haitian authorities, because "it was extremely unlikely that any action would be taken". Although Oxfam disclosed details of the incident to the Charity Commission, the Commission revealed after The Times investigation that it had never received Oxfam's final investigation report and Oxfam "did not detail the precise allegations, nor did it make any indication of potential sexual crimes involving minors". A spokesperson for the Commission commented that: "We will expect the charity to provide us with the assurance that it has learnt lessons from past incidents". Oxfam later explained it had not given details to the Commission beyond "inappropriate sexual behaviour" because using prostitutes in Haiti was not illegal.

In response to the revelations, Liz Truss, the chief secretary to the Treasury, described the reports as "shocking, sickening and depressing". Oxfam issued a statement in which it asserted "Oxfam treats any allegation of misconduct extremely seriously. As soon as we became aware of a range of allegations – including of sexual misconduct – in Haiti in 2011 we launched an internal investigation. The investigation was announced publicly and staff members were suspended pending the outcome". The statement also added that the allegations "that under-age girls may have been involved were not proven". Speaking on the BBC's Andrew Marr Show, the international development secretary, Penny Mordaunt, said Oxfam had failed in its "moral leadership" over the "scandal". Mordaunt also said that Oxfam did "absolutely the wrong thing" by not reporting the detail of the allegations to the government. The incident led the International Development Committee of the UK Parliament to issue a report about sexual harassment and abuse in the humanitarian sector on 31 July 2018. Former supporters who withdrew from their association with Oxfam at this time included Minnie Driver.

Oxfam had been aware that Van Hauwermeiren while director of Oxfam's relief operation in Chad in 2006 and other staff had repeatedly used prostitutes at the Oxfam team house there, and that one of Oxfam's staff members had been fired for his behaviour. Oxfam's deputy chief executive Penny Lawrence resigned, taking full responsibility and acknowledging that "(c)oncerns were raised about the behaviour of staff in Chad as well as Haiti that we failed to adequately act upon". CEO Mark Goldring also resigned a few months later. New allegations were made by a senior staffer, Helen Evans, who had been the lead investigator of organizational sexual misconduct between 2012 and 2015. A commentator in the medical journal The Lancet, Dr. Mishal S. Khan, argued the Oxfam sex scandal was "not surprising." It was reported that the scandal cost Oxfam £16 million in unrestricted funding, and job losses and closures of some Oxfam shops were admitted to be likely in consequence.

In June 2021, The Telegraph reported that leaked staff training documents claimed that "privileged white women" and "mainstream feminism" were supporting the root causes of sexual violence by wanting "bad men" fired or imprisoned, and adding that reporting sexual assault "legitimises criminal punishment, harming black and other marginalised people." In light of Oxfam's sexual misconduct scandals, Louise Perry of New Statesman said the documents "might well make pleasant reading for rapists," and characterized them as Oxfam appealing to identity politics and "woke" ideology in an attempt to "extricate itself from the shame of its ongoing failure."

Efficiency and accountability 
Charity Navigator gave Oxfam America a three-star overall rating, a two-star financial rating and a four-star accountability and transparency rating for the 2019 fiscal year.

Awards and nominations
In January 2013, Oxfam was nominated for the Charity of the Year award at the British Muslim Awards.

See also

 2007–08 world food price crisis
 Global Hunger Index
 Integrated Food Security Phase Classification
 Millennium Development Goals (Goal 1)
 Make Trade Fair
 Ox-Tales
 Universal Declaration on the Eradication of Hunger and Malnutrition (1974)

References

Further reading
 Berry, Craig, and Clive Gabay. "Transnational political action and 'global civil society' in practice: the case of Oxfam." Global Networks 9.3 (2009): 339–358. [ online]
 .
 . 
 Crewe, Emma. "Flagships and tumbleweed: A history of the politics of gender justice work in Oxfam GB 1986–2015." Progress in Development Studies 18.2 (2018): 110–125.
 Eadie, Deborah and Suzanne Williams, ed. The Oxfam Handbook of Development and Relief (2 vol. 1995).
 Gill, Peter. Drops in the ocean: the work of Oxfam 1960–1970 (1970).
 Hajnal, Peter I. "Oxfam International". in Peter I. Hajnal, ed. Civil society in the information age (Routledge, 2018). 57–66.
 Hilton, Matthew. "Oxfam and the Problem of NGO Aid Appraisal in the 1960s". Humanity: An International Journal of Human Rights, Humanitarianism, and Development 9.1 (2018): 1–18. abstract

Archival sources 
 Oxfam Canada fonds at Library and Archives Canada. Archival reference number, R2972. Former archival reference number, MG28-I270. Date range: 1958–1985. Extent: 17.855 meters of textual records; 873 photographs; 1 audio disc; 14 blueprints & maps.

External links

 

 
1942 establishments in England
Development charities based in the United Kingdom
Fair trade organizations
Glastonbury Festival
Humanitarian aid organizations
Hunger relief organizations
Organisations based in Oxford
Organizations established in 1942
Water-related charities
Organisations based in Nairobi